is a full-length novel by the Japanese writer Natsume Sōseki. The novel was originally published as a serialized work in the Japanese newspaper Asahi Shimbun from September 1 through December 29 of 1908. The Shunyōdō Shoten Company published it in book form in May 1909. The book is divided into 13 chapters. Sanshirō is the first in a trilogy of thematically related novels, along with the subsequent works And Then as well as The Gate.

The novel describes the experiences of Sanshirō Ogawa, a young man from the Kyushu countryside of southern Japan, as he arrives at the University of Tokyo and becomes acquainted with his new surroundings, fellow students, researchers, and professors. It also depicts his interaction with several young ladies and his first taste of romantic love.  Through Sanshirō and those around him, the novel presents extensive observations of and commentary on the Meiji-era Japanese society of its time.

Sanshirō is Sōseki's only coming-of-age novel. It has been translated into English by Jay Rubin.

Narrative 
The story is told in the third person, but it sometimes delves into Sanshirō's inner thoughts.

Background 
Sōseki taught as a professor at Sanshirō's alma mater ‘high school’ in Kumamoto from 1891 to 1894. Subsequently, and following his time abroad in London, he was given a professorship at the University of Tokyo, where the popular lecturer Lafcadio Hearn had recently resigned amidst controversy. A subplot of the novel, in which students lobby for a native Japanese appointment in the Department of Literature, is a playful reversal of the situation under which Sōseki took up his post.

Plot summary 
As the novel begins, Sanshirō (first name) Ogawa (family name) has graduated from high school (equivalent to modern-day college) in Kumamoto on the southern island of Kyushu and is riding the train north to pursue his graduate studies at the University of Tokyo.  During his second day on the train, a young woman asks Sanshirō for help with lodgings when they stop in Nagoya for the night. Through a misunderstanding, they end up in the same room with a single futon. Both to his relief and chagrin, Sanshirō sidesteps her openings for intimacy. As they part ways the next morning, she chides him for his lack of charisma.

Back on the train for his third and final day of travel, Sanshirō encounters an enigmatic man who casually declares that Japan is rushing toward its own destruction. The man also warns him against avarice and the hidden dangers that lurk beneath the smooth surfaces of society. Sanshirō later comes to know this man as Professor Hirota, a high school English teacher and amateur philosopher.

At the university, Sanshirō seeks out a physics researcher named Nonomiya, whom his mother introduces through a family connection. He also meets a fellow liberal arts student name Yojirō, who advises him on how to navigate the academic environment. Both Nonomiya and Yojirō are protégés of Professor Hirota, and these three characters, along with Yoshiko (Nonomiya's younger sister) and Mineko (the younger sister of another Hirota protégé) form Sanshirō's core circle of acquaintances.

As he settles into his new life in Tokyo, Sanshirō recognizes three distinct worlds of which he feels a part. The first is his hometown in Kyushu, and particularly his connection to his mother there. The second is the intellectual world, where thinkers such as Professor Hirota and Nonomiya lose themselves in pursuit of academic learning. The third world is the realm of human emotions, into which Sanshirō is drawn through his affection for Mineko.

The novel includes a comical subplot in which Yojirō, an incorrigible meddler, campaigns discreetly on behalf of Professor Hirota, hoping to have him appointed to the University faculty in the College of Letters. Yojirō pens an essay for the Literary Review under a pen name, expounding the benefits of a native Japanese appointment and all but nominating Professor Hirota as the man for the post. His scheming backfires terribly when a rival camp fingers Sanshirō as the author and publicly questions the professor's integrity. Yojirō is forced to come clean with the professor and endure his wrath.
 
The main point of tension in the novel is Sanshirō's ambiguous relationship with Mineko. Both feel, in some sense, an attraction for the other, and both, in another sense, are resigned to their respective fates. Older men, established in their careers, court Mineko. In the end she is married off, by arrangement, to an acquaintance of her elder brother. Sanshirō himself is under pressure from his mother to marry a local Kyushu girl to whose family his own has strong ties. Neither Sanshirō nor Mineko are assertive enough to defy convention, and in the end they let their romance, regrettably, fall by the wayside.

Main characters 
 Sanshirō Ogawa 
(referred to most often by his given name Sanshirō)
The main character of the novel, Sanshirō is 22 years old (23 by Japanese Meiji-era counting). As the novel opens, he has recently graduated from high school (equivalent to modern-day college) in Kumamoto is traveling to Tokyo to pursue graduate studies at the University of Tokyo in the College of Liberal Arts. 
 Sōhachi Nonomiya 
(referred to most often by his family name Nonomiya)
Cousin of an acquaintance of Sanshirō's mother. At his mother's suggestion, Sanshirō calls on Nonomiya during his first days in Tokyo and receives Nonomiya's guidance in orienting himself in his new surroundings. Nonomiya is a 29-year-old experimental physicist on the College of Science staff who leads a team to measure the electromagnetic pressure of light waves. He is courting Mineko, but their rational and romantic views of the world are often at odds.
 Yojirō Sasaki 
(referred to most often by his given name Yojirō)
An elective studies ‘special student’ in the College of Liberal Arts. Yojirō is endlessly scheming and meddling. His advice to Sanshirō is often valuable but occasionally detrimental. He boards with Professor Hirota, who is his former high school teacher.
Professor Chō Hirota
A graduate of Tokyo University who teaches English at a local high school (making him the equivalent to a modern-day college professor). The professor has a philosophical bent and is somewhat of a detached observer. He is unmarried and has no great ambition to advance in his career. In addition to Yojirō, whom he's retained as a boarding student, he retains close ties with Nonomiya and the Satomi family, whose eldest brother was also a former student.
Mineko Satomi 
(referred to most often by her given name Mineko)
The beautiful and talented youngest daughter of the Satomi family, a well-to-do Christian family that is headed now by Mineko's older brother. Mineko takes a dreamy, romantic view of the world and often has a far-away look as she gazes toward the sky and watches clouds.

Supporting characters 
 Yoshiko Nonomiya
(referred to most often by her given name Yoshiko)
Yoshiko, who is hospitalized with illness as the novel opens, is some years younger than her older brother Sōhachi and is still a student. Early in the story, she moves in to board with the Satomi's, and she is often found in the company of Mineko.
 Haraguchi (the painter)
Another acquaintance of Professor Hirota's. Haraguchi employs Mineko as his model for a full size portrait to show in his next exhibit. In explaining to Sanshirō that painting captures spirit through attention to detail, Haraguchi focuses on the expression in Mineko's eyes, noting that in the Japanese artistic tradition, a different aesthetic has developed than in the West, where "funny-looking big eyes" are considered beautiful.

Important places 
 Kyushu
Sanshirō's home region. The entire novel, with the exception of Sanshirō's initial train ride north, is set in Tokyo. Kyushu, however, figures prominently in Sanshirō's recollections and reflections. New of and stories from Kyushu also presented through the lengthy letters that Sanshirō receives from his mother.  
 University of Tokyo
The main setting of the novel.  Called Tokyo Imperial University at the time in which Sanshirō was written, it functioned as a graduate school (for graduates from the high school system). All of the key events of the novel take place within and around the university, or within a short train ride of the campus.
 The Pond
Now referred to as Sanshirō Pond. A natural area of the campus where Sanshirō first sees Mineko. Sanshirō often returns to this pond, both as a place for quiet reflection and as a place to stroll and converse with his acquaintances. The same setting is portrayed in Haraguchi's painting of Mineko.

Major themes 
Sanshirō is in one sense a coming-of-age novel. It follows Sanshirō as he begins to grasp the world and its possibilities, and also its limitations. The novel covers just a single semester, from September to just after the New Year. Sanshirō grows and learns throughout, but his growth is incremental and he is, in the end, by no means the master of his own future.

The novel also comments extensively, often through the musings of Professor Hirota, on modernization and the state of Japanese society. Topics include the recently won Russo-Japanese war, Western science, the role of women in society, approaches to academic instruction, and basic human nature.

Adaptations

Film 
A film adaptation of the novel called Natsume Sōseki's Sanshirō (夏目漱石の三四郎) was produced in 1955. The film was directed by Nobuo Nakagawa.

Television 
Several television adaptations of the novel have been created, including one in 1954 (Nippon TV), 1961 (NHK), 1968 (Mainichi Broadcasting System), 1974 (NHK), and 1994 (Fuji Television).

References

External links 
 Soseki Project  (resources for reading Sōseki's works in their original Japanese form)

Japanese bildungsromans
Novels by Natsume Sōseki
1908 novels
Japanese novels adapted into films